Armand de Souza (29 October 1874 – 1921) was a Ceylonese newspaper editor and democratic activist.

Early life 
De Souza was born in Assagaum, Goa, to a Roman Catholic family belonging to the Saraswat Brahman community. He was the tenth descendant of Roulu Camotin who had converted to Catholicism at the point of the sword in 1537, adopting Diego de Souza as his name at his baptism. Armand de Souza was the son of advocate Antonio Narcisso Vasconcellos de Souza, himself the son of advocate and Latin scholar, Antonio José de Souza.

Orphaned at a young age, he was left in the care of an aged grandmother who arranged that the boy's uncle, Dr Lisboa Pinto, should adopt him. Pinto was the Honorary Consul of the United States in the Colony of Ceylon. He enrolled the fifteen-year-old de Souza at the Royal College Colombo. Principal John Harward of Royal College encouraged de Souza's passion for history and English literature. De Souza cut his editorial teeth as the editor of the Royal College Magazine. At school he was known for his writing and oratory. De Souza was expected to be called to the Bar in the family tradition, but he fell out with his uncle and made his own way in life.

Career 
De Souza received his journalistic training at The Times of Ceylon where he worked for eight years. He moved to the Standard because he disagreed with the editor of the Times on public issues. He founded the Ceylon Morning Leader in July 1907 at age thirty-three. He worked as Chief Reporter and Sub-Editor, while the Chief Editor's position went to J. T. Blazé. However the proprietors insisted that De Souza take over, replacing Blazé's gentler prose with more forceful rhetoric. Over five years "he brought about a renaissance among the different communities in regards to matters social, political and intellectual. He was greatly responsible for the national awakening among the different classes and communities of the permanent population of the island…..to a very large extent to the awakening of the Singhalese in particular". He advocated for constitutional reform, particularly the right to elect four members, including one 'Educated Ceylonese Member' to the Legislative Council that until 15 November 1911 consisted of official and appointed members. He then fought for the election of all unofficial members according to constituencies and for an unofficial majority in the Legislative Council. He was opposed to racially-based representation in the Legislative Council and to the representation of the two major races respectively by two families over several generations.

In 1914 De Souza was indicted for writing an editorial entitled "Justice at Nuwara Eliya" that suggested that Thomas Arthur Hodson was sympathetic to the views of the constabulary when he tried cases as District Judge and Police Magistrate. He was represented by K.C. Bawa before a three-judge panel of the Supreme Court (Renton, Pereira and De Sampayo) that sentenced him to one month imprisonment, reportedly without a proper hearing. A public protest ensued. Harry Creasy wrote, "[i]t is as important to every man and woman in this colony that the Press should have full liberty to criticise and praise or condemn the actions of the government and all public officers as it is that the Courts should sternly repress any undue license in such criticisms or condemnations". The Press joined supported De Souza. After six days in his cell, De Souza was released by order of Sir Robert Chalmers, the Governor. He was led from the prison in a chariot, to much public clamour.

Works 
De Souza documented the race riots in Ceylon in 1915 in a book entitled Hundred days: Ceylon under martial law in 1915. A copy is in the library of Leonard Woolf, now in the Washington State University Libraries special collection.

Death 
De Souza died of enteric at the age of 47 in 1921.  His obituary in the Ceylon Morning Leader on 18 May 1921 read:

Family
He was father of Senator Doric de Souza of the LSSP (the Lanka Sama Samaja Party, Sri Lanka's Trotskyist party) and Torismund de Souza, Editor of the Times, as well as Aleric and Lena who both died young. Actress Fabianne Therese is his great-great-granddaughter.

References

Sources 

 "Mr. Armand de Souza". The African Times & Orient Review. June 1913, p. 40.

 De Souza, Armand. Hundred days: Ceylon under martial law in 1915. The Ceylon Morning Leader 1919. 318 pp.

1874 births
1921 deaths
Sri Lankan journalists
Sri Lankan Roman Catholics
Ceylonese people of Goan descent
Alumni of Royal College, Colombo
Indian emigrants to Sri Lanka
Emigrants from Portuguese India to Briitsh Ceylon
Emigrants from the Portuguese Empire to the British Empire